The Cahinnio were a Native American tribe that lived in Arkansas.

The Cahinnio were part of the Caddo Confederacy, possibly affiliated with Kadohadacho. In 1687 French explorer René-Robert Cavelier, Sieur de La Salle encountered the tribe, they settled near Red River, in southwest Arkansas.

In July 1687, Father Anastasius Douay, a French priest, visited a Cahinnio village near present-day Arkadelphia, Arkansas.

In the 1680s, French explorer Henri Joutel traveled with the La Salle expedition, to Cahinnio territory. He wrote that they presented his expedition with two loaves of corn bread, describing it as "the finest and the best we had so far seen; they seemed to have been baked in an oven, and yet we not noticed any among them." Joutel noted that corn was an important food staple among the Cahinnio, as were beans and sunflower seeds. Additionally he recorded that the Cahinnio used deer hide for pouches and bearskins for rugs.

The Cahinnio were known for their superior bows, which they made from Osage orange wood.

During the 18th century, the Cahinnio moved northwest, possibly due to new sources of salt and horses. They settled along the southern bank of the Ouachita River. By 1763, they moved to the upper Arkansas River. In 1771, the Cahinnio and several neighboring tribes signed a peace treaty with the French.

Ultimately, they assimilated into other Kadohadacho tribes by the 19th century. They are enrolled in the Caddo Nation of Oklahoma today.

Synonymy
The tribe is also known as the Cachaymon, Cahaynohoua, Caynigua Cahainihoua, and Cainione.

Notes

References
 Carter, Cecile Elkins. Caddo Indians: Where We Come From. Norman: University of Oklahoma Press, 2001. 
 Perttula, Timothy K. The Caddo Nation: Archaeological and Ethnohistoric Perspectives. Austin: University of Texas Press, 1997. .
 Sturtevant, William C., general editor and Raymond D. Fogelson, volume editor. Handbook of North American Indians: Southeast. Volume 14. Washington DC: Smithsonian Institution, 2004. .
 Swanton, John Reed. Source material on the history and ethnology of the Caddo Indians. Norman: University of Oklahoma Press, 1996. .

External links
 Cahinnio Indian Tribe History, from Access Genealogy

Caddoan peoples
Native American history of Arkansas
Native American tribes in Arkansas